Kurt Waitzmann (30 January 1905 – 21 May 1985) was a German film actor. He appeared in more than 50 films between 1937 and 1969.

Selected filmography

 Unternehmen Michael (1937) - Oblt. Weber
 Urlaub auf Ehrenwort (1938) - Gefreiter Dr. Wegener
 The Marriage Swindler (1938) - Mathias Schröder
 Mordsache Holm (1938) - Dr. Bernd Körner, Assessor
 Eine Frau kommt in die Tropen (1938) - Kurt v. Köllinghausen
 By a Silken Thread (1938) - Junger Rechtsanwalt
 Die Stimme aus dem Äther (1939) - Dr. Hannes Bolshausen
 Mann für Mann (1939) - Arzt
 My Daughter Doesn't Do That (1940) - Willy Dahlmann
 Between Hamburg and Haiti (1940) - Gustav Petersen
 Krach im Vorderhaus (1941) - Kuhlmann, Architekt
 Somewhere in Berlin (1946)
 The Time with You (1948) - Ein junger Mann
 Tragödie einer Leidenschaft (1949) - Sergey
 Verspieltes Leben (1949) - Friedrich von Siebenmühlen
 The Murder Trial of Doctor Jordan (1949)
 Five Suspects (1950) - Studienrat Dr. Claudius (uncredited)
 Love on Ice (1950) - Kurt Frischauf
 Fight of the Tertia (1952) - Schularzt
 Red Roses, Red Lips, Red Wine (1953)
 I and You (1953) - Herr Roland
 Hoheit lassen bitten (1954) - Herr von Röhne
 Die Mädels vom Immenhof (1955) - Karl-Heinz Kreienbaum (voice, uncredited)
 Roman einer Siebzehnjährigen (1955)
 Ein Mann muß nicht immer schön sein (1956) - Verteidiger
 Made in Germany (1957) - Dr. Mohr
 Endstation Liebe (1958) - Chef in der Fabrik
 Grabenplatz 17 (1958) - Jan Peters (uncredited)
 Rivalen der Manege (1958) - Kripobeamter
 The Csardas King (1958) - Kriektor Karscak
 A Thousand Stars Aglitter (1959) - 2. Gläubiger (uncredited)
 Morgen wirst du um mich weinen (1959) - Kommissar
 Yes, Women are Dangerous (1960) - Erster Offizier Petzold
 Marina (1960) - 1. Inspektor
 Brandenburg Division (1960) - 1. Offizier
 The Red Hand (1960) - Inspektor Wolff
 The Time Has Come (1960, TV Mini-Series) - Kommissar Wilde
 Immer Ärger mit dem Bett (1961)
 Robert and Bretram (1961) - Dr. Sommerfeld
 Das Geheimnis der schwarzen Koffer (1962) - Geschäftsführer der Soho-Bar
 Escape from East Berlin (1962) - Prof. Thomas Jurgens
  (1963, TV Series) - Arthur Crombie
 The Curse of the Hidden Vault (1964) - Mr. Simpson
 Der Hexer (1964) - Reddingwood
 Neues vom Hexer (1965) - Lanny
 Wild Kurdistan (1965) - Ingdscha's brother (uncredited)
 The Sinister Monk (1965) - Cunning
 The Hunchback of Soho (1966) - Sergeant
 The Monk with the Whip (1967) - Carrington
 The Hound of Blackwood Castle (1968) - Dr. Sheppard
 The Valley of Death (1968) - Col. Bergson
 Van de Velde: Das Leben zu zweit - Sexualität in der Ehe (1969) - Direktor (final film role)

References

External links

1905 births
1985 deaths
People from Bitterfeld-Wolfen
People from the Province of Saxony
German male film actors
20th-century German male actors